Francisco Morante Martínez (born 28 June 1992) is a Spanish footballer who plays for Spanish club Linares Deportivo as a defender.

References

1992 births
Living people
Footballers from Córdoba, Spain
Spanish footballers
Association football defenders
Segunda División B players
Tercera División players
Córdoba CF B players
Club Recreativo Granada players
Real Murcia players
CD Badajoz players
Salamanca CF UDS players
Internacional de Madrid players
Linares Deportivo footballers
I-League players
Mohun Bagan AC players
Spanish expatriate footballers
Expatriate footballers in India
Spanish expatriate sportspeople in India
Calcutta Football League players